

Belgium
 Congo Free State –  Théophile Wahis, Governor-General of the Congo Free State (1892–1908)

France
 French Somaliland – 
 Louis Ormiéres, acting Governor of French Somaliland (1905–1906)
 Patte, acting Governor of French Somaliland (1906)
 Pierre Hubert Auguste Pascal, Governor of French Somaliland (1906–1908)
 Guinea – 
 Antoine Marie Frezouls, Lieutenant-Governor of Guinea (1904–1906)
 Jules Louis Richard, acting Lieutenant-Governor of Guinea (1906–1907)

Japan
 Karafuto – Kumagai Kiichirō, Governor-General of Karafuto (28 July 1905 – 31 March 1907)
 Korea – Itō Hirobumi, Resident-General (1905–1909)
 Taiwan – 
Kodama Gentarō, Governor-General of Taiwan (26 February 1898 – April 1906)
Sakuma Samata, Governor-General of Taiwan (15 April 1906 – May 1915)

Portugal
 Angola – 
 Caminho de Ferro de Mossámedes, Governor-General of Angola (1905–1906)
 Eduardo Augusto Ferreira da Costa, Governor-General of Angola (1906–1907)

United Kingdom
 Barotziland-North-Western Rhodesia – Robert Thorne Coryndon, Administrator of Barotziland-North-Western Rhodesia (1900–1907)
 Jamaica – James Alexander Swettenham, Governor of Jamaica (1904–1907)
 Malta Colony – Charles Clarke, Governor of Malta (1903–1907)
 North-Eastern Rhodesia – Robert Edward Codrington, Administrator of North-Eastern Rhodesia (1900–1907)
 Straits Settlement – John Anderson, Governor of the Staits Settlement (1904–1911)

Colonial governors
Colonial governors
1906